Girl Next Door is the first album from Girl Next Door released on December 24, 2008. It was released in two versions, a Normal Edition and an Album+DVD version. Both versions had a first press which included a slipcase and one of two photobooks.  For the first time in the world of music, all the songs included in this album are tie-up to the media such as drama series, television shows, or commercials.

The album is certified platinum by RIAJ for shipment of 250,000 copies.

CD track list
 Winter Game
FujiTV show Uchikuru!? ending theme
 Drive Away
Toyota Technical Development commercial song
 Power of Love
Tokyo Tower 50th Anniversary official song
 
TBS show Osama no Branch October and November ending theme
 Winter Mirage
NTV drama Heroes Season 2 theme song
 
TVAsahi Drama Gira Gira theme song
 Fine After Rain
NTV show NNN News Realtime Real Sports section theme song
 Breath
TBS show Uwasa no! Tokyo Magazine ending theme
 Day's...
NTV show NNN Straight News weather theme
 Escape (Album Edit)
Toshiba cellphone W65T(au) commercial song
 Winter Garden
TBS show Rank Okoku December and January ending theme
 Climber's High
NTV show Guru Guru Ninety Nine ending theme
 Next Door
Tokyo FM Akasaka Yasuhiko no Dear Friends ending theme
  (Album Edit)
TBS show CDTV opening theme
TBS show Osama no Branch August and September ending theme
TBS show Arabiki-dan August and September ending theme

DVD track list
 Gūzen no Kakuritsu (music video)
 Drive Away (music video)
 Jōnetsu no Daishō (music video)
 Winter Game (music video)

Charts

Singles

References

2008 debut albums
Girl Next Door (band) albums